is a Japanese video game developer based in Osaka, Japan, with an additional office in Tokyo. It is best known for developing games in the Sonic the Hedgehog, Dragon Ball and Street Fighter franchises. The company was founded on March 6, 2000 by several former SNK and Capcom employees, including Street Fighter, Fatal Fury, Art of Fighting and The King of Fighters co-creator Takashi Nishiyama and Hiroshi Matsumoto.

History
In 2000, Takashi Nishiyama resigned from SNK, and was soon approached with offers for employment by various Tokyo-based companies. At the same time, SNK's core development team members left the company, assuming Nishiyama had plans. Nishiyama decided to form a new company in Osaka, named Sokiac, to avoid having to move his team members and their families. To better reflect its mission to create games for a variety of genres and platforms, the company later changed its name to Dimps, short for "Digital Multi-Platforms". The company was supported by capital from Sammy, Bandai, Sony Computer Entertainment, and Sega.

Games developed

References

External links
  
 Safari Games website 
 Dimps profile on MobyGames

Bandai Namco Holdings subsidiaries
Companies based in Osaka Prefecture
Japanese companies established in 2000
Sony Interactive Entertainment
Video game companies established in 2000
Video game companies of Japan
Video game development companies